Robin Cooper is a former American football coach.  He served as the head football coach at MacMurray College in Jacksonville, Illinois from 1985 to 1985, at the University of Evansville in Evansville, Indiana from 1991 to 1997, and at North Park University in Chicago from 2001 to 2005, compuling  career college football coaching record of 51–83.

Head coaching record

References

Year of birth missing (living people)
Living people
Evansville Purple Aces football coaches
Illinois Wesleyan Titans baseball players
Illinois Wesleyan Titans football players
MacMurray Highlanders football coaches
North Park Vikings football coaches
Western Illinois Leathernecks football coaches
High school baseball coaches in the United States
Junior college football coaches in the United States